This article show all participating team squads at the 2015 Girls' Youth European Volleyball Championship, played by sixteen countries with the final round held in Bulgaria

Pool A

The following is the Serbian roster in the 2015 Girls' Youth European Volleyball Championship.

Head Coach:  Jovo Cakovic

The following is the Russian roster in the 2015 Girls' Youth European Volleyball Championship.

Head Coach:  Svetlana Safronova

The following is the Italian roster in the 2015 Girls' Youth European Volleyball Championship.

Head Coach:  Marco Mencarelli

The following is the German roster in the 2015 Girls' Youth European Volleyball Championship.

Head Coach:  Jens Tietböhl

The following is the Grecian roster in the 2015 Girls' Youth European Volleyball Championship.

Head Coach:  Kyriakos Kamperidis

The following is the Slovenian roster in the 2015 Girls' Youth European Volleyball Championship.

Head Coach:  Oleg Gorbachov

Pool B

The following is the Turkish roster in the 2015 Girls' Youth European Volleyball Championship.

Head Coach:  Mehmet Nur Bedestenloglu

The following is the Belgian roster in the 2015 Girls' Youth European Volleyball Championship.

Head Coach:  Fien Callens

The following is the Polish roster in the 2015 Girls' Youth European Volleyball Championship.

Head Coach:  Andrzej Pec

The following is the Czechs roster in the 2015 Girls' Youth European Volleyball Championship.

Head Coach:  Ales Novak

The following is the Dutch roster in the 2015 Girls' Youth European Volleyball Championship.

Head Coach:  Saskia Van Hintum

The following is the Bulgarian roster in the 2015 Girls' Youth European Volleyball Championship.

Head Coach:  Radoslav Bakardzhiev

See also
2015 Boys' Youth European Volleyball Championship squads

References

External links
Official website

Girls' Youth European Volleyball Championship
Volleyball
Volleyball in Bulgaria
International volleyball competitions hosted by Bulgaria